Pellah Al Motaz Okasha (born 14 February 1990) is an Egyptian basketball player for Gezira of the Egyptian Basketball Premier League.

He represented Egypt's national basketball team at the 2017 Arab Nations Basketball Championship, where he recorded most minutes, assists and steals for his team and helped secure the gold medal.

References

External links
 FIBA profile
 REAL GM profile
 Afrobasket.com profile

1990 births
Living people
Gezira basketball players
Egyptian men's basketball players
Point guards
Sportspeople from Giza
21st-century Egyptian people